Synaphea endothrix is a shrub endemic to Western Australia.

It is found on lateritic rises along the west coast in the Wheatbelt region of Western Australia between Coorow and Dandaragan where it grows in sandy-loamy-gravelly soils over laterite.

References

Eudicots of Western Australia
endothrix
Endemic flora of Western Australia
Plants described in 1995